The 2010 FIM Superstock 1000 Cup was the twelfth season of the FIM Superstock 1000 championship, the sixth held under this name. The FIM Superstock 1000 championship followed the same calendar as the Superbike World Championship, with the exception that it did not venture outside of Europe, leaving the schedule at ten rounds.

BMW joined the Superstock grid to bolster the regular manufacturers, and eventually claimed the riders' championship with Ayrton Badovini and the manufacturers' championship as well. Badovini won the first nine races before being beaten by Maxime Berger in the final round.

Race calendar and results

Championship standings

Riders' standings

Manufacturers' standings

References

Superstock 1000
FIM Superstock 1000 Cup seasons
FIM Superstock 1000 Cup